Zbigniew Sosnowski (born 10 December 1963 in Rypin) is a Polish politician. He was elected to the Sejm on 25 September 2005, getting 5937 votes in 5 Toruń district as a candidate from the Polish People's Party list.

He was also a member of Sejm 2001-2005.

See also
Members of Polish Sejm 2005-2007

External links
Zbigniew Sosnowski - parliamentary page - includes declarations of interest, voting record, and transcripts of speeches.

Members of the Polish Sejm 2005–2007
Members of the Polish Sejm 2001–2005
Polish People's Party politicians
1963 births
Living people
People from Rypin County
Members of the Polish Sejm 2011–2015

pl:Zbigniew Sosnowski